The rinkhals (Hemachatus haemachatus), also known as the ringhals  or ring-necked spitting cobra, is a species of venomous snake in the family Elapidae. The species is found in parts of southern Africa. It is not a true cobra in that it does not belong to the genus Naja, but instead belongs to the monotypic genus Hemachatus. While rinkhals bear a great resemblance to true cobras they also possess some remarkable differences from these, resulting in their placement outside the genus Naja.

Description
Colouration varies throughout its distribution area, but a characteristic of the species is the belly is dark with one or two light-coloured crossbands on the throat.  Their average length is 90–110 cm. Some individuals may have a mostly black body, while others are striped. Rinkhals scales are distinct from those of Naja cobras in that they are ridged and keel-like.

Scale pattern
Scalation:
dorsal scales are keeled
17–19 rows of dorsal scales at midbody 
116–150 ventral scales
anal plate is entire 
30–47 subcaudal scales, paired 
7 upper labial scales  
upper labials 3 and 4 entering the eye 
1 preocular  (rarely up to 3) 
3 postoculars 
8–9 lower labials

Distribution

This species is found in the Western and Eastern Cape provinces of South Africa, northeast through the Free State, Lesotho, Transkei, KwaZulu-Natal, South Africa, Western Eswatini, Mpumalanga and parts of Gauteng, South Africa.  An isolated population is centered on Inyanga on the Zimbabwe-Mozambique border. There are no recent records from this population; it might be extinct.

Behaviour and diet
The rinkhals has a varied diet. Its main prey is toads, but it also eats small mammals,  amphibians, and other reptiles.

Another difference between the rinkhals and the African cobras, is that they are ovoviviparous. They give birth to 20–35 live young, but as many as 65 young have been recorded.

Venom
The venom of the rinkhals is neurotoxic and partially cytotoxic, and is less viscous than that of other African elapids. When confronting a human, it generally aims its venom at the face. If the venom gets injected, it causes great amount of pain and even necrosis due to the cytotoxic effect. If the venom enters the eyes, it causes great pain.

A polyvalent antivenom exists in South Africa.  A polyvalent antivenom is currently being developed by the Universidad de Costa Rica's Instituto Clodomiro Picado.

Symptoms of a bite
 Local symptoms of swelling and bruising is reported in about 25% (a quarter) of cases.  General symptoms of drowsiness, nausea, vomiting, violent abdominal pain, cramps and vertigo often occur, as does a mild pyrexial reaction.

Defensive behaviour
If distressed, the rinkhals spreads its hood, showing its distinctive, striped neck. It can spray its venom up to 2.5 m. It generally rears up and flings its body forward as it sprays its venom because unlike true spitting cobras, its aim is very poor but it can spit without doing this. It is also known to fake death (thanatosis) very convincingly by rolling onto its back with its mouth agape.

Habitat
The rinkhals generally prefers grassland habitats because it allows them to blend in with the surroundings. Rinkhals also may live in swamps around southern Africa.

References

Further reading

Access Professional Development. 2022. Rinkhals (Hemachatus haemachatus). [Online] Available: https://accesspd.co.za/species/Rinkhals (Accessed: 02/02/2022)

Elapidae
Snakes of Africa
Reptiles of Eswatini
Reptiles of Lesotho
Reptiles of South Africa
Reptiles of Zimbabwe
Reptiles described in 1790
Taxa named by Pierre Joseph Bonnaterre
Afrikaans words and phrases